is an adult visual novel released by Yuzusoft on March 30, 2012. It is the 6th visual novel from Yuzusoft, immediately following Noble Works and Tenshin Ranman. It has three manga adaptations.

Plot 

The story takes place on the man-made floating island of Aqua Eden, where gambling and prostitution are considered legal by the government.

One summer day, Yūuto Mutsura and Naota Kurahashi travel to the island to lose their virginity. During their visit, they meet a girl named Miu, who directs them to a brothel. During a misunderstanding, Miu gets kidnapped, is taken to a harbor and is held for ransom. Yuuto then goes to the harbor to rescue her, where he too is taken hostage. The kidnappers are arrested by an island security task force.  During a subsequent misunderstanding, Yuuto is turned into a vampire, learns that Aqua Eden is really a safe haven for vampires and that Miu is a vampire herself.

Characters

Main Characters 

 —The protagonist. He and his friend go to Aqua Eden to lose their virginity, but, instead, he gets turned into a vampire.
 —A telekinetic veteran vampire who sides with a security task force on Aqua Eden. She considers herself responsible for turning Yuuto into a vampire.
 —A human girl who does not like being treated like a child. She is the academy's dormitory headmaster.
 —A vampire waitress at the Alexandrite restaurant/pub in the shopping district, who possesses super-human strength. She is sexually naive and is a common target of jokes.
 —A Russian vampire who is transferred to Aqua Eden in order to promote the vampire population. Works as a Bunny girl at the Orthoclase casino. She likes to tease people, but doesn't like being teased herself. She makes vulgar jokes to discover others' reactions. She's different from a normal vampire because she needs to suck vampire blood to use her powers that control the electricity.

Sub Characters 

 
 
 
 
 
 
 
 

Music

Theme song: Scarlet 

 Songwriters: Yui Sakakibara, Famishin, Inohara Satoru (Angel Note)
 Performance:  Yui Sakakibara

Character song

1. Love Incident (character : Miu Yarai) 

 Songwriters:  kala（Angel Note），Famishin,  Inohara Satoru (Angel Note)
 Performance: Miu Yarai

2. Growling! (character : Azusa mera) 

 Songwriters:  Kamishiro Ami（Angel Note），Famishin,  Inohara Satoru (Angel Note)
 Performance: Azusa mera

3. きっと大丈夫 (character : Rio Inamura) 

 Songwriters:  Mami Nakayama（Angel Note），Famishin,  RM-G (Angel Note)
 Performance: Rio Inamura

4. NO LIMIT (character : Elina Olegovna Obeh) 

 Songwriters:  Riryka（Angel Note），Famishin,  BAL（Angel Note）
 Performance: Elina Olegovna Obeh

References

External links 
 Dracu-riot! Official Website
 

Visual novels
Eroge